The smc PENTAX DA 12-24mm F4.0 ED AL (IF) is a wide angle zoom lens by Pentax for K mount.

External links

Official page

12-24